Geoff Willis (20 August 1921 – 27 October 1986) was an  Australian rules footballer who played with North Melbourne in the Victorian Football League (VFL).

Willis was captain-coach of Griffith Football Club in the South West Football League (New South Wales) in 1947 (3rd) and 1948 (4th) and he won the 1948 SWDFL Gammage Medal.

Notes

External links 

1921 births
1986 deaths
Australian rules footballers from Victoria (Australia)
North Melbourne Football Club players